Giovanni Battista Cicala Zoagli (Genoa, 1485 - Genoa, 1566) was the 63rd Doge of the Republic of Genoa.

Biography 
Zoagli was remembered by historians as "rigorous" for the economy of the Genoese state. As doge he had to face again the problem of Corsica which returned under the unique power of the Republic, no longer therefore of the Bank of Saint George, as well as other "mainland" towns and cities.

In the two years that led the government of Genoa, he promoted a real policy of saving public finances and, more importantly for the doge himself, to cancel or almost cancel the Genoese insolvency, both of the state and its citizens, against creditors. After his mandate ended in January 1563 he was appointed perpetual procurator. He died in Genoa in 1566.

See also 

 Republic of Genoa
 Doge of Genoa

Sources 

 Buonadonna, Sergio. Rosso doge. I dogi della Repubblica di Genova dal 1339 al 1797.

References

16th-century Doges of Genoa
1485 births
1566 deaths